Zamia acuminata is a species of plant in the family Zamiaceae which  is threatened by habitat loss. It is found in Costa Rica, Nicaragua, and Panama.

References

acuminata
Flora of Costa Rica
Flora of Nicaragua
Flora of Panama
Taxonomy articles created by Polbot